This is a list of deities in fire worship.

African mythology

Yoruba mythology
 Ogun, fire god and patron of blacksmiths, iron, warfare, metal tools
 Ọya, goddess of fire, wind, transforms into buffalo, fertility
 Shango, god of thunder and fire, considered the storm-god
 Aggayu, god of volcanoes, magma, sunlight, and heat

Egyptian mythology
 Ra, fire god of the sun, light, warmth, and growth
 Sekhmet, protective lioness goddess of war, along with some elements of disease and curing of disease. Sometimes referenced in relation to the sun and its power, so possibly had to do with upkeep of the sun at times and fire
 Wadjet, the protective serpent goddess who sends fire to burn her enemies

Asian mythology

Ainu mythology
 Kamuy-huci, goddess of the fire

Chinese mythology

 Zhurong (Huoshen, God of Fire)
 Huilu (Huoshen, Goddess of Fire)
 Yandi (Huozhu, Accident of Fire)
 Shennong (Huozhu, Accident of Fire) 
 Hua Guang Da Di
 Ebo (Huozheng, Primary Fire)
 Yùyōu (Huoqi, Energy of Fire)
 Bǐngdīngwèi Sīhuǒ Dàshén
 Yǐwǔwèi Sīhuǒ Dàdì
 Nánfāng Chìjīng Dìjūn

Filipino mythology

Rirryaw Añitu: Ivatan place spirit Añitus who played music and sang inside a cave in Sabtang, while lighting up fire; believed to have change residences after they were disturbed by a man
Bathala: the Tagalog supreme god and creator deity, also known as Bathala Maykapal, Lumilikha, and Abba; an enormous being with control over thunder, lightning, flood, fire, thunder, and earthquakes; presides over lesser deities and uses spirits to intercede between divinities and mortals
Mangkukulam: a Tagalog divinity who pretends to be a doctor and emits fire
Gugurang: the Bicolano supreme god; causes the pit of Mayon volcano to rumble when he is displeased; cut Mt. Malinao in hald with a thunderbolt; the god of good
Unnamed God: a Bicolano sun god who fell in love with the mortal, Rosa; refused to light the world until his father consented to their marriage; he afterwards visited Rosa, but forgetting to remove his powers over fire, he accidentally burned Rosa's whole village until nothing but hot springs remained
Makilum-sa-bagidan: the Bisaya god of fire
Lalahon: the Bisaya goddess of fire, volcanoes, and the harvest; also referred as Laon
Gunung: a Bisaya deity of volcanoes
Taliyakud: the chief Tagbanwa god of the underworld who tends a fire between two tree trunks; asks the souls of the dead questions, where the soul's louse acts as the conscience that answers the questions truthfully; if the soul is wicked, it is pitched and burned, but if it is good, it passes on to a happier place with abundant food
Diwata: general term for Tagbanwa deities; they created the first man made from earth and gave him the elements of fire, the flint-like stones, iron, and tinder, as well as rice and most importantly, rice-wine, which humans could use to call the deities and the spirits of their dead
Unnamed Gods: the Bagobo gods whose fires create smoke that becomes the white clouds, while the sun creates yellow clouds that make the colors of the rainbow
Cumucul: the T'boli son of the supreme deities; has a cohort of fire, a sword and shield; married to Boi’Kafil
Segoyong: the Teduray guardians of the classes of natural phenomena; punishes humans to do not show respect and steal their wards; many of them specialize in a class, which can be water, trees, grasses, caves behind waterfalls, land caves, snakes, fire, nunuk trees, deers, and pigs

Hindu mythology
 Agneya, daughter of Agni and guardian of the south-east
 Agni, god of fire, messengers, and purification
 Ilā, goddess of speech and nourishment invoked during the agni-hotra ceremony
 Makara Jyothi, a star revered on a festival
 Mātariśvan, god of fire associated with Agni

Khanty mythology 

 Nay-Angki - goddess of fire.

Korean mythology
 Jowangsin, goddess of the hearth fires

Japanese mythology
 Amaterasu, goddess of the sun
 Kagu-tsuchi (kami), blacksmith god of fire whose birth burned his mother Izanami to death
 Kōjin, god of fire, hearth, and the kitchen
 Konohanasakuya-hime, goddess of volcanoes

Mongolian mythology
 Arshi Tenger, god of fire associated with shamanic rituals
 Odqan, red god of fire who rides on a brown goat
 Yal-un Eke, mother goddess of fire who is Odqan's counterpart

Nivkhi mythology
 Turgmam, goddess of fire

Persian mythology
 Atar, yazata of fire in Persian mythology and Zoroastrianism

Taiwanese mythology
 Komod Pazik, Sakizaya god of fire
 Icep Kanasaw, Sakizaya goddess of fire

Turkic mythology
 Alaz, god of fire
 Od Iyesi, familiar spirits who protect fires
 Ut, Siberian goddess of the hearth
 Vut-Ami, Chuvash goddess of fires.

Vietnamese mythology
 Ông Táo, god of stove and fire
 Bà Hỏa, goddess of fire
 Quang Hoa Mã Nguyên Súy, god of preventing fire-related accidents 
 Nam Phương Xích Đế, fire god

European mythology

Albanian mythology 
En/ Enji, god of fire
Nëna e Vatrës, hearth goddess
Verbt, storm god who controls fire, water and wind

Basque mythology
 Eate, god of fire and storms

Caucasian mythology
 Alpan, Lezghin (Dagestanian) goddess of fire
 Kamar, Georgian fire goddess who was kidnapped by Amirani
 Uorsar, Adyghe goddess of the hearth
 Wine Gwasche, Circassian goddess who protects the hearth

Celtic mythology
 Brigit, Irish goddess of fire, poetry, arts, and crafts
 Aed, Irish god whose name means "fire"
 Grannus, god of fire, health, water springs, and the sun
 Nantosuelta, goddess of fire, nature, fertility, rivers and the earth

Etruscan mythology
 Sethlans, fire god of smithing and crafts

Greek mythology
 Hephaestus, god of blacksmiths, crafting, fire, and volcanoes, Roman form Vulcan
 Hestia, goddess of the hearth and its fires
 Prometheus, god of fire, is credited with the creation of humanity from clay, and who defies the gods by stealing fire and giving it to humanity as civilization

Lithuanian mythology
 Dimstipatis, protector of the house, housewives, and the hearth against fire outbreaks
 Gabija, protective goddess of the hearth and the household
 Jagaubis, household spirit of fire and the furnace
 Moterų Gabija, goddess of bakeries and bread
 Pelenų Gabija, goddess of fireplaces
 Praurimė, goddess of the sacred fire served by her priestesses, the vaidilutės
 Trotytojas Kibirkščių, deity of sparks and fires

Norse mythology
 Glöð, Jötunn who is the wife of Logi and who rules with him
 Logi, Jötunn who personifies fire

Ossetian mythology
 Safa, god of the hearth chain
 Mariel, Fire goddess

Roman mythology
 Caca, goddess who was Vulcan's daughter and who might have been worshipped before Vesta
 Cacus, god who was the fire-breathing giant son of Vulcan, and who might have been worshipped in ancient times
 Fornax, goddess of the furnace
 Stata Mater, goddess who stops fires
 Vesta, goddess of the hearth and its fire, Roman form of Hestia.
 Vulcan, god of crafting and fire, Roman form of Hephaestus

Sicilian mythology
 Adranus, god formerly worshipped in Adranus, near Mount Etna

Slavic mythology
 Dazhbog, the regenerating god of the solar fire who rides in the sky
 Kresnik, golden fire god who became a hero of Slovenia
 Ognyena Maria, fire goddess who assists Perun
 Peklenc, god of fire who rules the underworld and its wealth and who judges and punishes the wicked through earthquakes
 Svarog, the bright god of fire, smithing, and the sun, and is sometimes considered as the creator
 Svarožič, the god of the earthly fire

Middle Eastern mythology

Canaanite mythology
 Ishat, Phoenician fire and drought goddess slain by Anat
 Shapash, goddess of the sun

Hittite mythology
 Arinitti, sun goddess of the city of Arinna, and the goddess of hearth fires, temple flames, and chthonic fires in later times.

Mesopotamian mythology
 Gerra, god of fire in Akkadian and Babylonian records
 Gibil, skilled god of fire and smithing in Sumerian records
 Ishum, god of fire who was the brother of the sun god Shamash, and an attendant of Erra
 Nusku, god of heavenly and earthly fire and light, and patron of the arts

Native American mythology

Aztec mythology
 Chantico, goddess of the hearth fires and volcanoes
 Mixcoatl, hunting god who introduced fire to humanity
 Xiuhtecuhtli, god of fire, day, heat, volcanoes, food in famine, the year, turquoise, the Aztec emperors, and the afterlife

Huichol mythology
 Tatewari, fire god of shamans

Mayan mythology
 Huracán, fire god of storms and wind who created and destroyed humanity
 Jacawitz, fire god who was a companion of the sun god Tohil

Navajo mythology
 Black God, frail stellar fire god who introduced the fire drill to humanity

Purépecha mythology
 Curicaueri, the primordial fire that originates the sun. Main deity of the purépecha people of central Mexico.

Quechua mythology
 Manqu Qhapaq, fire and sun god who founded the Inca civilization and introduced technology to humanity
 Mama Nina, Her name means "Mother of fire" in quechua, she's the goddess of fire, light and volcanoes

Oceanian mythology

Fijian mythology
 Gedi, fire and fertility god who taught humanity to use fire

Hawaiian mythology
 Pele, goddess of fire, wind, and volcanoes

Māori mythology
 Auahitūroa, god of fire and comets and husband of Mahuika
 Mahuea, goddess of fire
 Mahuika, goddess of fire who was tricked into revealing to her grandson Māui the knowledge of fire
 Ngā Mānawa, five fire gods who are sons of Auahitūroa and Mahuika

Samoan mythology
 Ti'iti'i, god of fire that brought fire to people of Samoa after a battle with the earthquake god, Mafui'e.

Putarsim mythology 
 Emharti, goddess of fire, water, and opposition. One of the 3 firstborns of Saulis and Menesla

References

 
Fire